Stirling High School is a public English medium co-educational high school situated in the suburb of Stirling in East London in the Eastern Cape province of South Africa and is located in Gleneagles Road. It is one of the top and most academic schools in the Eastern Cape.

The school offers grade 8–12 education and has approximately 2000 students.

Academics
Subjects include: English Home Language, Afrikaans 1st additional language, Xhosa 1st additional language, Mathematics, Sciences, Biology, Accounting, Economics, Business Studies, Information Technology (IT), Computer Applications Technology (CAT), Music, Art, Consumer Studies, Life Orientation, Geography, History, Drama and Engineering Graphics and Design.

Sport
 Athletics
 Badminton 
 Biathlon 
 Cricket
 Cross country
 Golf
 Hockey
 Horse riding
 Netball
 Rowing 
 Rugby
 Squash 
 Swimming 
 Surfing 
 Tennis 
 Water polo

Cultural: 

Drama, Music, Art, Dance, debating, Choir, service, Chess, Matric fashion show, Mr & Ms Stirling, Stirling Jazz Bands 

Pastoral / social: 

Leadership camp, Ubuntu society, The Book Club

Stirling has the following facilities available:
4 Rugby Fields
2 Artificial Hockey Surfaces (1 full sized with floodlights, 1 mini training surface)
3 Cricket Fields 
10 Cricket Nets
6 Squash Courts
1 Heated Indoor Swimming/Water Polo Pool
6 Tennis Courts
5 Netball Courts
1 Gym
1 Multipurpose School Hall
1 Professional Theater 
3 Music/Drama Rooms
3 Computer Labs
1 Library/Media Centre 
Classrooms with Interactive Whiteboards
Hostel facilities for boarders

History

East London was served by the East London Technical and Commercial High School, a dual medium school, established in 1968, that grew out of and operated as a day school in the buildings of the then East London Technical College, now the East London FET College, that itself was established in 1927.  The College itself largely taught post school candidates after working hours.  The Technical and Commercial High School offered courses in a technical or commercial direction in Standards Eight to Ten – now Grades Ten to Twelve.  Admission was a pass in Standard Seven, now grade nine.
National education policy in the 1960s determined that each educational region should have a technical high school and a commercial high school as specialist schools.  Plans were thus put in place to build a commercial high school for East London, and the old race course site, that had lain fallow for many years after horse racing had discontinued, because it was financially not viable, was acquired.

This school was completed and was occupied in late September 1973, with classes commencing at the start of the fourth term of that year, with Dr Boshoff as the Principal.  Mr Bob Conibear was a Vice-Principal and Miss Ath Schroeder and Miss SC Groenewald teachers of Shorthand/Typing and Afrikaans.  Mrs Olive van Rooyen joined the staff in 1977. Henry Hill joined the staff in October 1975 and Piet Janson joined the staff in 1977.
The Technical High School remained at the Technical College until the Education Department purchased the old De La Salle College building, a Catholic school for boys that had closed some years before.  Workshops were built, and Port Rex Technical High School at last had its own building.  The colours of the combined school had been maroon and blue, and Port Rex still have the maroon blazer, while the East London Commercial High School's colour was blue, the colour representing commerce.
In 1974, the Commercial High School admitted Standard Six pupils for the first time, and had their first Standard Seven class in 1975.  The school grew rapidly and soon had well over seven hundred pupils.  However, nationwide the commercial high school concept did not succeed because it was undermined by concessions made to ordinary high schools, that were losing pupils to the commercial high schools, and these school persuaded their MECs to get for them exemption from the limitation placed on them on the commercial subjects they could offer.  This led to a decline in numbers and the introduction of some non-commercial subjects at this school.

Eventually the governing body of the time decided that the school should change to an ordinary community or academic high school, and applied to the Education Department to allow the change.  At the same time Stirling Primary School was applying for its own high school to be established.  This was because the school was losing many of its best pupils at the end of their Standard Four year, as pupils transferred to other primary schools that had their own high schools, thus ensuring admission to high school.
Dr Schalk Walters, who later became the Head of the then Cape Education Department, was tasked to investigate the application for the change of status of the school.  His recommendation was that the school change to an ordinary high school, that it become an English medium school, and suggested that the name Stirling High School be selected, as the school was located in the suburb of Stirling.  The Governing Body of the time decided to adopt the name.

However, in 2019, everything was about to change. It started with an incident that happened that year when a group of hooligans that go by the name of r/F1lthy stapled soggy bread to a tree they hung out at during break times. This would then start a series of events so insane and amazing, it would be too difficult to put into words. But it made the r/F1lthy group legends of Stirling High School. In 2021, on the day of their final exam, the r/F1lthy group decided to cemented their names in the history and legends of Stirling High School by stapling more bread to that same tree they hung out at. Nobody knows the names of the members of said group but they were legendary.

Name

The name's story was researched by Max Phillips, a businessman in East London at the time, and also the first Chairman of the Commercial High School Committee, who wrote a weekly column in The Daily Dispatch.  He undertook to find out exactly why the area is called Stirling.  He recorded his findings in his article in The Daily Dispatch of 9 September 1985. The area of Stirling was farmland bought by Julius Sparg, and while the deed of transfer of the land was recorded in 1935, he later named it the Stirling Estate, naming it after the passenger liner Stirling Castle, that was built in 1936, when that ship called at East London on her maiden voyage. The Stirlng Castle was named after the real Stirling Castle that is to be found in Stirling in Scotland, which many Stirling staff members and past pupils have visited over the years.

After World War II, returning soldiers were given land all over South Africa on which to build homes, and in East London that was on the Stirling Estate. As the suburb grew, streets were named after other ships of the Union-Castle Line such as Galway, Kenilworth, Arundel, Roslin, Armadale, Carisbrook, Sandown and Dunbar.

Coat of arms

"When a new coat-of-arms is being designed, it is the usual practice to try to incorporate into the coat-of-arms something alluding to the name of the school, or other body, and something alluding to its local situation.  Stirling High School is named after the suburb of East London in which it is situated; and the suburb itself, it has been established, is named after the Stirling Castle, one of the mailships which used to operate between South Africa and Great Britain.  The coat-of-arms of Stirling, in Scotland, is a very complicated piece of heraldry, but one of the devices in the coat of arms is a castle, an allusion to the castle at Stirling.  The town of Stirling was one of the special group of Scottish towns which were called ‘royal burghs’ or ‘royal towns’.  The towns which had been accorded this honour were entitled to place below the shield of their coat-of-arms a battlement wall between the towers.  The battlement horizontal silver band across the centre of the Stirling High School badge is thus derived from the special honourable device below the arms of the Burgh of Stirling in Scotland as well as being an allusion to the castle of Stirling.  The two towers are similarly derived from the same source, and being two in number recall that there are two schools which bear the name of ‘Stirling’ – Stirlng High School and Stirling Primary School.  It is also an allusion to the fact that Stirling High School is located in the Border area of the Cape Province, in which there are a number of battlemented forts which are reminders of the frontier wars of last century, of course, now two centuries ago.

The flaming torch is an often used symbol of education; and in your coat-of-arms it has a double significance.  Firstly, it emphasises the educational nature of the body to whom the badge belongs; and secondly it perpetuates the memory of the Commercial High School which was the predecessor of Stirling High School.  The background of the badge is half blue and half green, combining the colours of the former Commercial High School and Stirling Primary School.  The blue background against which the towers are displayed is an allusion to the sky, and also to the sea which emphasises the maritime location of Stirling High School and Stirling Primary School.  The whole is placed within a gold border, which serves to unite the whole design into one harmonious whole, as well as to separate the badge from the colour of the blazer pocket on which it is worn.  The green and gold colours also serve to recall that the suburb of Stirling was created to provide homes for soldiers who had returned from the Second World War – green and gold were the distinctive colours of the ‘boks’ who fought in the Second World War no less than of the ‘boks’ who won victories on the playing fields of the world.  It is for this reason that the primary school selected green and gold as its colours.

A coat-of-arms or badge should fulfill three requirements –

(a) it should be distinctive;
(b) it should be simple and should not be cluttered with too many symbols in its composition; and
(c) it should be elegant and aesthetically pleasing.

It is a great joy that the badge of Stirling High School passes each of these tests with the highest possible commendation.  When the final drawing is received from the State Herald, it will be found that the shield as you see it today, will have a green and gold decorative mantling round it; and will have above it a crest consisting of a blue and silver anchor with a green and gold cable.  The colours of the crest thus, again, symbolise the old Commercial High School and Stirling Primary School; and the anchor is a happy choice alluding firstly to the City of East London in which the two schools are located; and secondly to the ship ‘Stirling Castle.’  The anchor will be flanked by two oak leaves and two coral tree leaves – ‘Stirling in Scotland’ and ‘Stirling in the Border region of the Cape Province where the coral tree grows prolifically,’ even in the immediate environment of your school."

Motto

The motto, ‘Semper Fidelis’, may be translated as being "always grinding", which was the motto of the Commercial High School.

References

3. The subreddit of r/F1lthy 

Schools in the Eastern Cape
East London, Eastern Cape
1973 establishments in South Africa